Psedaleulia manapilao is a species of moth of the family Tortricidae. It is found in Cotopaxi Province, Ecuador.

The ground colour of the forewings is cream sprinkled yellow brown. The markings are yellowish brown. The hindwings are whitish cream.

Etymology
The species name refers to the name of a road from La Maná to Pilalo, the collection site of the species.

References

Moths described in 2008
Euliini